
Gmina Nowa Wieś Wielka is a rural gmina (administrative district) in Bydgoszcz County, Kuyavian-Pomeranian Voivodeship, in north-central Poland.

Villages
Gmina Nowa Wieś Wielka contains the villages and settlements of Brzoza, Chmielniki, Dąbrowa Wielka, Dobromierz, Dziemionna, Emilianowo, Jakubowo, Januszkowo, Kobylarnia, Kolankowo, Leszyce, Nowa Wieś Wielka, Nowa Wioska, Nowe Smolno, Olimpin, Piecki, Prądocin and Tarkowo Dolne.

Neighbouring gminas
Gmina Nowa Wieś Wielka is bordered by the city of Bydgoszcz and by the gminas of Białe Błota, Łabiszyn, Rojewo, Solec Kujawski and Złotniki Kujawskie.

References
Polish official population figures 2006

Nowa Wies Wielka
Bydgoszcz County